is a Japanese manga artist, screenwriter, animator and film director. He is best known as the creator of Akira, in terms of both the original 1982 manga series and the 1988 animated film adaptation. He was decorated a Chevalier of the French Ordre des Arts et des Lettres in 2005, promoted to Officier of the order in 2014, became the fourth manga artist ever inducted into the American Eisner Award Hall of Fame in 2012, and was awarded the Purple Medal of Honor from the Japanese government in 2013. Otomo later received the Winsor McCay Award at the 41st Annie Awards in 2014 and the 2015 Grand Prix de la ville d'Angoulême, the first manga artist to receive the award. Otomo is married to Yoko Otomo. Together they have one child, a son named Shohei Otomo, who is also an artist.

Early life
Katsuhiro Otomo was born in Tome, Miyagi Prefecture and grew up in Tome District. He said that living in the very rural Tōhoku region left him with nothing to do as a child, so he read a lot of manga. As the only boy in a family with older and younger sisters, he enjoyed reading and drawing manga on his own and thought about becoming a manga artist. Limited by his parents to buying one manga book a month, Otomo typically chose Kobunsha's Shōnen magazine, which included Astro Boy by Osamu Tezuka and Tetsujin 28-go by Mitsuteru Yokoyama, series which he would copy drawing in elementary school. However, he said it was after reading Shotaro Ishinomori's How to Draw Manga that he understood how to draw manga properly and started doing so more seriously.

In high school, Otomo developed an interest in movies, that led to his ambition to become an illustrator or film director. At this time, one of his friends introduced him to an editor at Futabasha, who, after seeing Otomo's manga, told the high school student to contact him if he moved to Tokyo after graduating. Otomo did exactly that, and began his career as a professional manga artist.

Career

Manga
On October 4, 1973, Otomo published his first work, a manga adaptation of Prosper Mérimée's short story Mateo Falcone, titled A Gun Report.

In 1979, after writing multiple short-stories for the magazine Weekly Manga Action, Otomo created his first science-fiction work, titled Fireball. Although the manga was never completed, it is regarded as a milestone in Otomo's career as it contained many of the same themes he would explore in his later, more successful manga such as Dōmu.  Dōmu began serialization in January 1980 and ran until July 1981. It was not published in book form until 1983, when it won the Nihon SF Taisho Award. It also won the 1984 Seiun Award for Best Comic.

In a collaboration with writer Toshihiko Yahagi, Otomo illustrated Kibun wa mō Sensō about a fictional war that erupts in the border between China and the Soviet Union. It was published in Weekly Manga Action from 1980 to 1981 and collected into one volume in 1982. It won the 1982 Seiun Award for Best Comic. 38 years later, the two created the one-shot sequel Kibun wa mō Sensō 3 (Datta Kamo Shirenai) for the April 16, 2019 issue of the magazine.

Also in 1981, Otomo drew A Farewell to Weapons for the November 16 issue of Kodansha's Young Magazine. It was later included in the 1990 short story collection Kanojo no Omoide....

In 1982, Otomo began what would become his most acclaimed and famous work: Akira. Kodansha had been asking him to write a series for their new Young Magazine for some time, but he had been busy with other work. From the first meeting with the publisher, Akira was to be only about ten chapters "or something like that," so Otomo said he was really not expecting it to be a success. It was serialized for eight years and 2000 pages of artwork.

In 1990, Otomo did a brief interview with MTV for a general segment on the Japanese manga scene at the time. Otomo created the one-shot Hi no Yōjin about people who put out fires in Japan's Edo period for the debut issue of Comic Cue in January 1995.

Otomo wrote the 2001 picture book Hipira: The Little Vampire, which was illustrated by Shinji Kimura.

Otomo created the full-color work DJ Teck no Morning Attack for the April 2012 issue of Geijutsu Shincho.

Following the 2011 Tōhoku earthquake and tsunami, Otomo, a native of the Tōhoku region, designed a relief that features a boy riding a robot goldfish in rough seas, while flanked by Fūjin and Raijin. Intended to capture the region's will to overcome the natural disaster, it has been located on the first floor of the terminal building at Sendai Airport since March 2015.

In 2019, Kodansha announced that they will be re-releasing Otomo's entire body of manga since 1971 as part of "The Complete Works Project". It was noted that some of his manga were edited when initially compiled into book format, and this new project, personally overseen by Otomo, plans to restore them to how they appeared in their original serialization.

Otomo was initially reported in 2012 to be working on his first long-form manga since Akira. Planning to draw the work that is set during Japan's Meiji period without assistants, he was initially targeting a younger audience, but said the story had developed more towards an older one. Although planned to begin in fall 2012, Otomo revealed in November of that year that the series had been delayed. In 2018, Otomo said he is working on a full-length work, but the contents are secret.

Film
At the age of 25, Otomo spent about 5 million yen to make a 16 mm live-action film about an hour long. He said that making this private film showed him roughly how to make and direct movies. In 1982, Otomo made his anime debut, working as character designer for the animated film Harmagedon: Genma Wars. It was while working on this film that Otomo began to think he could do it by himself.

In 1987, Otomo directed an animated work for the first time: a segment, which he also wrote the screenplay and drew animation for, in the anthology feature Neo Tokyo. He followed this up with two segments in another anthology released that year, Robot Carnival. In 1988, he directed the animated film adaptation of his manga Akira.

Otomo was executive producer of 1995's Memories, an anthology film based on three of his stories. Additionally, he wrote the script for Stink Bomb and Cannon Fodder, the latter of which he also directed.

Otomo has worked extensively with the studio Sunrise. In 1998, he directed the CG short Gundam: Mission to the Rise to celebrate the 20th anniversary of their Gundam franchise. The studio has animated and produced his 2004 feature film Steamboy, 2006's Freedom Project, and 2007's SOS! Tokyo Metro Explorers: The Next. The last, is based on Otomo's 1980 manga SOS! Tokyo Metro Explorer and follows the son of its main characters.

The 2001 animated film Metropolis features a script written by Otomo that adapts Tezuka's manga of the same name.

Otomo directed the 2006 live-action film Mushishi, based on Yuki Urushibara's manga of the same name.

In 2013, Otomo took part in Short Peace, an anthology consisting on 4 short films; he directed Combustible, a tragic love story set in the Edo period based on his 1995 manga Hi no Yōjin, while Hajime Katoki directed A Farewell to Weapons, depicting a battle in a ruined Tokyo based on Otomo's 1981 manga of the same name. Combustible won the Grand Prize in the Animation category of the Japan Media Arts Festival in 2012, and was shortlisted for the 2013 Best Animated Short at the 85th Academy Awards, but failed to get nominated.

Otomo directed the music video for Aya Nakano's 2016 song "Juku-Hatachi". He is a fan of the singer and previously drew the cover to her 2014 album Warui Kuse.

Reports have suggested that Otomo will be the executive producer of the live-action film adaptation of Akira. In 2019, he announced that he is writing and directing an animated film adaptation of his 2001 manga Orbital Era with Sunrise.

Style
Otomo said that when he started his professional career in the late 1970s, "almost all manga was gekiga like Golgo 13. So it was all gekiga or sports manga, nothing to do with science fiction." Remembering how much he loved science fiction as a child, Otomo wanted to recreate that kind of excitement; "That was in part how something like Domu came about. [...] There was no hard science fiction manga [...] so I wanted to change that and do something more realistic and believable."

Describing his characterization style, Otomo said he first tried to draw and imitate "very traditional manga-like art," such as Astro Boy. But by the time he was in high school, illustration work by people like Tadanori Yokoo and Yoshitaro Isaka was popular, so he wanted to create manga characters with this illustrative art style. When asked about how Japanese critics praise him as the first manga artist to draw realistic Japanese faces, Otomo said he always tries to balance fantasy and realism; "Depicting things too realistically actually damages the social realism of the piece, and if you go too far into the realm of fantasy, that hurts its imaginative ability." However, he said the realism of his early works probably came from having used friends as character models. French cartoonist Moebius, who is known for realistic character designs, is often cited as one of Otomo's biggest influences.

Otomo includes homages to his favorite childhood manga in his work, and there were three manga authors that he really respected; Osamu Tezuka, Shotaro Ishinomori and Mitsuteru Yokoyama. He named the main computer in Fireball ATOM after Tezuka's character of the same name, the character nicknamed Ecchan in Domu is a reference to Ishinomori's Sarutobi Ecchan, and the title character of Akira is also known as No. 28 in homage to Yokoyama's Tetsujin 28-go in addition to the two series having the "same overall plot." Ever since depicting the apartment complex in Domu, Otomo has had a large interest in architecture, proclaiming, "I don't think there was anyone before me who put this much effort into their depictions of buildings." He believes this habit of drawing detailed backgrounds was influenced by Shigeru Mizuki's manga, which showed him how important backdrops are to a story. Otomo strongly praised the framing done by Tetsuya Chiba, whose work he studied a lot out of admiration, for making it easy to grasp how tangible the backgrounds and characters are.

When asked about his influences in designing the mecha in Farewell to Weapons, Otomo pointed out that Studio Nue's work was popular at the time, specifically mentioning the powered suit designs by Kazutaka Miyatake and Naoyuki Kato. He also stated that he is a fan of mecha by Takashi Watabe and Makoto Kobayashi and is fond of those seen in Neon Genesis Evangelion, but explained that all his influences are jumbled and mixed together; "In short, I digest many different things and ideas tend to pop out from that."

Legacy

It was around the 1979 publication of his Short Peace short story collection that Otomo's work became influential in Japan. Artists influenced by him and his work include Hisashi Eguchi, Naoki Urasawa, Naoki Yamamoto, Makoto Aida and Hiroya Oku. When talking in 1997 about the future of manga, Urasawa opined that "[Osamu] Tezuka created the form that exists today, then caricatures appeared next, and comics changed again when Katsuhiro Otomo came on the scene. I don't think there's any room left for further changes." Masashi Kishimoto cited Otomo as one of his two biggest influences, but liked Otomo's art style the best and imitated it while trying to develop his own.

Otomo's manga work also notably influenced a number of Japanese video game designers by the mid-1980s, including Enix's Yuji Horii (The Portopia Serial Murder Case and Dragon Quest), Capcom's Noritaka Funamizu (Gun.Smoke and Hyper Dyne Side Arms), UPL's Tsutomu Fujisawa (Ninja-Kid), Thinking Rabbit's Hiroyuki Imabayashi (Sokoban), dB-SOFT's Naoto Shinada (Volguard), Hot-B's Jun Kuriyama (Psychic City), and Microcabin's Masashi Katou (Eiyuu Densetsu Saga).

Director Satoshi Kon, who worked as an assistant to Otomo in both manga and film, cited Akira and especially Domu as influences. American film director Rian Johnson is a big fan of Otomo and pointed out similarities between how telekinesis is depicted in Domu and its depiction in his film Looper.

In 2017, the book Otomo: A Global Tribute to the Mind Behind Akira was published in Japan, France and the United States, featuring writing and artwork from 80 artists such as Masakazu Katsura, Taiyo Matsumoto, Masamune Shirow, Asaf and Tomer Hanuka, and Stan Sakai. From April 8 to May 8, 2021, comic art collector Phillipe Labaune's self-titled art gallery in New York City held "Good For Health, Bad For Education: A Tribute to Otomo" as its first exhibition. Including pieces originally curated by Julien Brugeas for the 2016 Angoulême International Comics Festival, it featured a total of 29 Otomo-inspired works by international artists such as Sara Pichelli, Paul Pope, Boulet, François Boucq, Giannis Milonogiannis and Ian Bertram.

Bibliography

Manga

Short story collections

Artbooks

Filmography
Anime

Live-action

Additional work

Besides his own animation, Otomo has contributed art designs to Harmagedon: Genma Wars, the Crusher Joe film, the seven-part OVA series Freedom Project, and Space Dandy episode 22. 

He also oversaw the composition of the Spriggan animated film and directed the music video  for Aya Nakano.

Notes

References

 "Freedom". (May 2007) Newtype USA. p. 23.

External links

 Otomo: The Complete Works
 
 
 Katsuhiro Ôtomo at The Encyclopedia of Science Fiction

 
1954 births
Living people
Anime screenwriters
Annie Award winners
Officiers of the Ordre des Arts et des Lettres
Grand Prix de la ville d'Angoulême winners
Japanese animators
Anime directors
Japanese film directors
Japanese animated film directors
Japanese animated film producers
Japanese screenwriters
Manga artists from Miyagi Prefecture
Recipients of the Medal with Purple Ribbon
Science fiction film directors
Sunrise (company) people
Will Eisner Award Hall of Fame inductees
Winner of Kodansha Manga Award (General)
Writers from Miyagi Prefecture
Cyberpunk writers